Mesa is the surname of:

Antonio Mesa, Cuban baseball player, member of the Cuban Baseball Hall of Fame
Arnaldo Mesa (1967–2012), Cuban boxer
Carlos Mesa (born 1953), Bolivian historian and former politician
Cristóbal de Mesa (1559–1633), Spanish Mannerist poet and writer
Eddie Mesa (born 1940), Filipino actor and singer
José Mesa (born 1966), American baseball pitcher
Juan de Mesa (1583–1627), Spanish Baroque sculptor
Juan Carlos Mesa (born 1930), Argentine humorist, screenwriter and director
Liana Mesa (born 1977), Cuban volleyball player
Maikel Mesa (born 1991), Spanish footballer
Manuel Mesa (born 1952), Spanish retired footballer
Melky Mesa (born 1987), Dominican professional baseball outfielder
Milena Mesa (born 1993), Cuban team handball player
Raúl Mesa (born 1982), Spanish beach volleyball player
Roque Mesa (born 1989), Spanish footballer
Ubaldo Mesa (1973–2005), Colombian cyclist
Uberlino Mesa (born 1971), Colombian cyclist
Víctor Mesa (born 1960), Cuban baseball player
Vilma Mesa (born 1963), Colombian-American mathematics educator
Yosniel Mesa (born 1980), Cuban football forward
Nano Mesa (born 1995), Spanish footballer